Norwegian County Road 709 (abbreviated as Fv709) is a Norwegian county road which runs between the villages of Børsa and Hove in the municipality of Skaun in Trøndelag county, Norway. Prior to 1 January 2010, this road was a Norwegian national road; on that date the regional reform came into force, and the status of this road was downgraded from a national road to a county road.

Path

Børsa village (northern terminus)
 ←Buvika, →Orkanger
Eggkleiva village
 →Morken
Børselva bridge
 ←Sætran
 →Melby
Skaun village
 ←Rekstad
 →Melby
 ←Rekstad
Lake Malmsjøen
Hove village
 ←Melhus, →Korsvegen (southern terminus)

References

709
Skaun